Saint Mary Catholic Church in Hana is a parish of the Roman Catholic Church of Hawaii in the United States.  Located in Hana on the island of Maui, the church falls under the jurisdiction of the Diocese of Honolulu and its bishop.  It is named after Mary, the mother of Jesus.

Mary Catholic Church in Hana, Saint
Religious buildings and structures in Maui County, Hawaii
Roman Catholic churches in Hawaii